Karl Landsberg (13 May 1890 – 4 August 1964) was a Swedish cyclist. He competed in two events at the 1912 Summer Olympics.

References

External links
 

1890 births
1964 deaths
Swedish male cyclists
Olympic cyclists of Sweden
Cyclists at the 1912 Summer Olympics
Sportspeople from Örebro